The chestnut-collared longspur (Calcarius ornatus) is a species of bird in the family Calcariidae. Like the other longspurs, it is a small ground-feeding bird that primarily eats seeds. It breeds in prairie habitats in Canada and the northern United States and winters to the south in the United States and Mexico.

Description 
These birds have a short conical bill, a streaked back and a white tail with a dark tip. In breeding plumage, the male has black underparts, a chestnut nape, a yellow throat and a black crown. Other birds have light brown underparts, a dark crown, brown wings and may have some chestnut on the nape.

Measurements:

 Length: 5.1-6.5 in (13-16.5 cm)
 Weight: 0.6-0.8 oz (17-23 g)
 Wingspan: 25-27 cm

Distribution and status 
This bird breeds in short and mixed grass prairies in central Canada and the north central United States. In winter, they migrate in flocks to prairies and open fields in the southern United States and Mexico. Like other prairie birds, they have disappeared from some areas because of habitat loss but are still fairly common.

Controlled burns may benefit this species as they feed on low-growing plants that are more easily spotted after a fire.

Behavior 
These birds forage on the ground, gathering in flocks in winter. They mainly eat seeds, also eating insects in summer. Young birds are mainly fed insects.

The female lays 4 or 5 eggs in a grass cup nest in a shallow scrape on the ground. The male sings and flies up to defend his territory. Both parents feed the young birds.

The call is a two-syllabled chee dee.

References

External links

Chestnut-collared longspur species account - Cornell Lab of Ornithology
Chestnut-collared longspur - USGS Patuxent Bird Identification InfoCenter
Chestnut-collared longspur videos on the Internet Bird Collection
Chestnut-collared longspur photo gallery VIREO

chestnut-collared longspur
Native birds of the Canadian Prairies
Native birds of the Plains-Midwest (United States)
Fauna of the Chihuahuan Desert
chestnut-collared longspur
chestnut-collared longspur